Peter Thacher Washburn (September 7, 1814 – February 7, 1870) was a Vermont lawyer, politician and soldier.  A veteran of the American Civil War, he served as the 31st governor of Vermont as a Republican from 1869 to 1870, and was the first Vermont Governor to die in office.

Washburn was a native of Lynn, Massachusetts, and was raised in Ludlow, Vermont.  he graduated from Dartmouth College in 1835, and taught school while studying law.  He was admitted to the bar in 1838, and practiced law, first in Ludlow and then in Woodstock, while also becoming active in politics as a Whig.  In addition to campaigning for Whigs including William Henry Harrison, Washburn held elected and appointed offices, including Reporter of Decisions for the Vermont Supreme Court and member of the Vermont House of Representatives.

In Woodstock Washburn also was active in the Vermont Militia; he was commander of a regiment with the rank of colonel in the late 1830s through the 1850s, and organized a company in anticipation of the American Civil War, which he commanded as a captain.  Washburn's company was federalized in 1861 as part of the 1st Vermont Infantry; he was commissioned as the regiment's lieutenant colonel and second-in-command.  He became the de facto commander after John W. Phelps was promoted to command of a brigade, and he led the regiment in the Battle of Big Bethel. In late 1861 Washburn was elected adjutant general of Vermont, and as such organized Vermont's participation in the Civil War until the completion of the war, including the state's response to the St. Albans Raid. As Adjutant General Washburn kept track of the over 34,000 Vermont men who enlisted in the Union Army. 

In 1869, Washburn was the successful Republican nominee for governor. He served from October 15 until his death on February 7, 1870. His death in Woodstock was attributed to exhaustion caused by overwork.

Early life
Washburn was born in Lynn, Massachusetts, on September 7, 1814, the son of Judge Reuben and Hannah Blaney (Thacher) Washburn. Judge Washburn's grandfather Seth Washburn was a Colonel in the American Revolution. Seth's son Asa Washburn, the Governor's grandfather, moved from Massachusetts to Putney, Vermont in 1785. Judge Reuben Washburn settled in Ludlow, Vermont in 1825.  Washburn attended the public schools of Ludlow and Black River Academy, then attended Dartmouth College.  He graduated in 1835, and was a member of Phi Beta Kappa.  He was principal of the Haverhill Academy while studying law under his father in Ludlow, and with William Upham in Montpelier.  After completing his legal education with a year at Harvard Law School, in 1838 Washburn was admitted to the bar, and he began practicing law in Ludlow in January 1839.

Active in politics as a Whig, Washburn was one of the secretaries of a Windsor County convention organized to support William Henry Harrison in the 1840 presidential election.  From 1840 to 1842, Washburn served as Assistant Clerk of the Vermont House of Representatives.

In 1844, Washburn moved to Woodstock and formed a partnership with Charles P. Marsh, which they maintained until Washburn's death in 1870.  Also in 1844, Washburn was elected reporter of decisions of the Vermont Supreme Court, a position he held for eight years.  He represented Woodstock in the Vermont House of Representatives from 1853 to 1855.  Washburn was also involved in civic causes, including becoming active in the temperance movement.  He became active in the Republican Party in 1855; he was a delegate to the 1860 Republican National Convention, and served as chairman of the Vermont delegation.

Civil War
Washburn had served as colonel of a Vermont militia regiment from 1837 until 1841, and in 1857 he organized the Woodstock Light Infantry company, which he commanded as a captain.  In 1861, Washburn's unit was mustered into federal service for the American Civil War as Company B, 1st Vermont Infantry.  He was commissioned lieutenant colonel and second in command of the regiment on May 9, 1861.

The commander of the 1st Vermont, John W. Phelps, was soon promoted to brigadier general and command of a brigade, so Washburn was the regiment's de facto commander during nearly all of its three months of service at Fortress Monroe and Newport News, Virginia.  Washburn also commanded five companies of the 1st Vermont and five from the 4th Massachusetts infantry at the Battle of Big Bethel on June 10, 1861.  He was mustered out with his regiment on August 15, 1861.

Later career
In October 1861, the Vermont General Assembly elected Washburn to succeed Horace Henry Baxter as Adjutant General and Inspector General of the state militia with the rank of brigadier general.  During his tenure, he oversaw the raising, equipping and fielding of seven infantry regiments, one cavalry regiment, three batteries of light artillery, and two companies of sharpshooters for the Union Army.

Washburn also took charge of Vermont's response following the October 1864 St. Albans Raid by Confederate soldiers based in Canada.  The state responded by organizing the Frontier Cavalry and deploying it to patrol the Canadian border with Vermont and New York, and Vermont's contingent included two companies, one based in Burlington, and one in St. Albans.

Washburn issued a militia commission to Ann Eliza Smith, the wife of Governor J. Gregory Smith.  The Smiths were residents of St. Albans, and Smith had been in the state capital of Montpelier on the day of the raid.  His home was a target, and when Mrs. Smith appeared in the front doorway carrying an unloaded pistol (the only weapon she could find), the raiders decided to bypass the house.  Mrs. Smith then worked to organize the people of St. Albans to mount a pursuit of the raiders, which unsuccessfully attempted to prevent them from escaping to Canada.  Washburn recognized her heroism by appointing her as a brevet lieutenant colonel on the adjutant general's military staff.

Under Washburn's leadership, the adjutant general's office compiled 300 bound volumes of commander's reports, accounts and other records pertaining to service members from Vermont who took part in the war.  Of the more than 34,000 men Vermont provided to the Union, only 75 were unaccounted for after the war.

In 1866, Washburn declined reelection as adjutant general.  He was succeeded by William Wells.  Washburn was one of the organizers of the Reunion Society of Vermont Officers and delivered the keynote address at the society's 1868 annual meeting.

In addition to resuming his law practice, Washburn was an organizer of the Woodstock Railroad Company, of which he was elected president.  He also served on the board of directors for the Rutland and Woodstock Railroad.

Governor
In 1869, Washburn was a candidate for governor and won the Republican nomination at the party's state convention in June by defeating Dudley Chase Denison and Julius Converse.  He defeated Democrat Homer W. Heaton in the general election, and took office on October 15, 1869.  During his term, the state enacted a law changing the term for state offices including governor from one year to two.

Death and burial
Washburn died in Woodstock on February 7, 1870.  Doctors could not find a cause, and attributed his death to nervous exhaustion brought on by overwork.  He was interred at River Street Cemetery in Woodstock.

Family
In 1839, Washburn was married to Almira E. Ferris (1816-1848) of Swanton, Vermont.  In 1849, he married Almira P. Hopkins (1816-1910) of Glens Falls, New York.  With his first wife Washburn was the father of son Ferris (1842-1860), who died at age 18 while a student at Dartmouth College, and daughter Emily May ("Emma"), who died at age 6 (1846-1853).  With his second wife, Washburn was the father of four children, including Thacher (1859-1862), who died as an infant.  Daughter Elizabeth (1852-1938), the wife of Thomas Wilson Dorr Worthen survived him, as did daughter Mary (1854-1941), the wife of George B. Parkinson, and son Charles (1856-1904).

Washburn was a descendant of James Chilton through Chilton's daughter Mary.  As a result of this family connection, Washburn's surviving children became members of the Society of Mayflower Descendants when it was founded in the late 1800s.

References

Sources

Books

Internet

Magazines

Newspapers

Further reading
 Benedict, G. G., Vermont in the Civil War. A History of the part taken by the Vermont Soldiers And Sailors in the War For The Union, 1861-5. Burlington, VT.: The Free Press Association, 1888.
 Peck, Theodore S., compiler, Revised Roster of Vermont Volunteers and lists of Vermonters Who Served in the Army and Navy of the United States During the War of the Rebellion, 1861-66. Montpelier, VT.: Press of the Watchman Publishing Co., 1892, pp. 5–9, 744.
 Waite, Otis F. R., Vermont in the Great Rebellion: Containing historical and biographical Sketches, etc.,'' Claremont, NH: Tracy, Chase, 1869, pp. 256–8.

External links

Peter T. Washburn at Vermont in the Civil War
Peter T. Washburn at National Governors Association

Peter T. Washburn at The Political Graveyard

1814 births
1870 deaths
Dartmouth College alumni
Vermont lawyers
Vermont Whigs
Vermont Republicans
Governors of Vermont
Members of the Vermont House of Representatives
People of Vermont in the American Civil War
National Guard (United States) officers
People from Ludlow (town), Vermont
Burials in Vermont
Republican Party governors of Vermont
19th-century American politicians
19th-century American lawyers